Tebaldi is an Italian surname. Notable people with the surname include:
 House of Tebaldi, a noble Roman family;
 Giacomo Tebaldi (died 1465), Italian cardinal
 Renata Tebaldi (1922–2004), Italian lyric soprano
 Tito Tebaldi (born 1987), Italian rugby union player
 Valerio Tebaldi (born 1965), Italian professional road bicycle racer

Etymology

See also
 Tibaldi
 Lungotevere dei Tebaldi, a Roman road dedicated to the House of Tebaldi

References

Germanic-language surnames
Surnames of Italian origin